Lal is a surname and a given name.

Lal or LAL may also refer to:

Places 
 Lal wa Sarjangal, also simply Lal, a town in Ghor Province, Afghanistan
 Lal, Iran (disambiguation), the name of two places

People
 Lal (actor), stage name of Indian film actor, producer and director M. P. Michael (born 1958)
 Lal Jr., stage name of Indian director Jean Paul Lal (born 1988), son of M. P. Michael
 Lal Waterson (1943–1998), British musician

Other uses
 LAL (band), a Canadian electronic/house/world musician collective
 Lal, a fictional character in "The Offspring" (Star Trek: The Next Generation)
 Lanka Ashok Leyland, a Sri Lanka truck manufacturer
 Licence Art Libre, or Free Art Licence
 Lightning activity level, a six-point scale measuring the amount of lightning produced by a thunderstorm
 Limulus amebocyte lysate, an aqueous extract of blood cells from the Atlantic horseshoe crab
 Livonia, Avon and Lakeville Railroad, New York, U.S.
 Air Labrador, a Canadian airline, ICAO airline designator LAL
 Lakeland Linder International Airport, Florida, U.S., FAA airport code LAL
 Los Angeles Lakers, a professional basketball team

See also
 
 
 Lal Lal, Victoria, Australia
 Lala (disambiguation)
 Lal Bal Pal, a group of three nationalists in British-ruled India
 Laal (disambiguation)